Julia Martínez Fernández (born 5 December 1931) is a Spanish film and television actress. She was awarded the Silver Shell for Best Actress at the San Sebastian International Film Festival in 1953.

Selected filmography
 Spanish Serenade (1952)
 A Room for Three (1952)
 Flight 971 (1953)
 Nobody Will Know (1953)
 The Last Torch Song (1957)
 Miracle of the White Suit (1956)
 L'amore più bello (1958)

References

Bibliography 
 Bentley, Bernard. A Companion to Spanish Cinema. Boydell & Brewer 2008.

External links 
 

1931 births
Living people
Spanish television actresses
Spanish film actresses
People from Santander, Spain